Phaenospermatae is a tribe of grasses, subfamily Pooideae, containing a single genus, Phaenosperma. The tribe previously included several other genera, which are now placed in a separate tribe, Duthieeae.

References

Pooideae
Poaceae tribes
Monotypic plant taxa